Khido Khundi (2018) is a Punjabi movie about hockey. The movie depicts the reality of the Indian hockey players from Sansarpur, Punjab, India.

Synopsis 
Khido Khundi is based on 2 brothers and the passion for hockey in Punjab.

Cast 
 Ranjit Bawa as Fateh 
 Manav Vij as Harry
 Mandy Takhar as Laali
 Guggu Gill as Balveer Singh
 Mahabir Bhullar as Pargat Singh
 Elnaaz Norouzi as Naaz 
 Seema Kaushal
 Jatinder Kaur as Bachni Kaur
 James Breakey as Captain Ruff

References

External links

Punjabi-language Indian films
2010s Punjabi-language films
Indian sports drama films
2000s sports drama films